Senigallia (or Sinigaglia in Old Italian, Romagnol: S’nigaja) is a comune and port town on Italy's Adriatic coast. It is situated in the province of Ancona in the Marche region and lies approximately 30 kilometers north-west of the provincial capital city Ancona. Senigallia's small port is located at the mouth of the river Misa. It is one of the endpoints of the Massa-Senigallia Line, one of the most important dividing lines (isoglosses) in the classification of the Romance languages.

History
Senigallia was first settled in the 4th century BC by the gallic tribe of the Senones who first settled this coastal area. In 284 BC, the settlement was taken over by Romans, who established the colony Sena Gallica there. "Sena" is probably a corrupted form of "Senones" and "Gallica" (meaning "Gaulish") distinguished it from Saena (Siena) in Etruria.

In the prelude to the Battle of the Metaurus between Romans and Carthaginians in 207 BC, Sena Gallica was the southernmost point of Carthaginian General Hasdrubal Barca's invasion of Italy. Senigallia was ravaged by Alaric during the decline of the Roman Empire and fortified when it became part of the Byzantine Empire. It was again laid waste by the Lombards in the 8th century and by the Saracens in the 9th. It was one of the five cities of the medieval Adriatic duchy of Pentapolis.

The diocese and the bishopric had long been established, and the city saw economic development, including the establishment of the so-called Magdalena Fair around the 13th century. The fair's popularity grew when Sergius, count of Senigallia, became engaged to the daughter of the count of Marseilles. On his engagement, the count of Marseilles presented Sergius with relics, said to be of Mary Magdalene. The fair was visited by merchants from both Europe and the Levant.

In the 15th century, Senigallia was captured and recaptured many times by opposing sides during the Guelph and Ghibelline war. Sigismondo Pandolfo Malatesta of Rimini fortified the town in the years 1450-1455. Pope Pius II made his nephew Antonio Piccolomini Lord of Senigallia in [?] but in 1464 the residents pledged loyalty to Pope Paul II. In 1472, Giacomo Piccolomini tried but failed to seize the town. In 1503 Cesare Borgia, the brother of the famous Lucrezia Borgia and illegitimate son of the Pope Alexander VI, carried out a  coup at Senigallia against some of his disloyal supporters. Pope Sixtus IV assigned the lordship to the Della Rovere family. In 1516 this was temporarily revoked by Pope Leo X who transferred the Lordship to his nephew Lorenzo II de Medici, then again the Della Rovere family took over from 1624, when Senigallia eventually was annexed to the Papal States' legation (province) of Urbino.

Senigallia is the birthplace of Giovanni Maria Mastai Ferretti,  Pope Pius IX. He was born here in 1792, became pope in 1846, and was the last pope to rule the Papal States before Italian unification.

During the First World War, the town and its port were devastated by intensive shelling by units of the Austro-Hungarian navy led by the battleship SMS Zrínyi.
The town was also badly damaged by a powerful earthquake in 1930 and during the Second World War.

After the war, Senigallia became a well known summer holiday destination in Italy.

Among the better known contemporary personalities from the city were the photographer Mario Giacomelli and rapper Fabri Fibra.

Geography
The municipality borders Belvedere Ostrense, Mondolfo (PU), Monte San Vito, Montemarciano, Morro d'Alba, Ostra and Trecastelli.

The municipality includes the hamlets (frazioni) of Bettolelle, Borgo Bicchia, Borgo Catena, Borgo Passera, Brugnetto, Cannella, Castellaro, Cesanella, Cesano, Ciarnin, Filetto, Gabriella, Grottino, Mandriola, Marzocca, Montignano, Roncitelli, Sant'Angelo, San Silvestro, Scapezzano and Vallone.

Main sights
Though traces of the city's history are still visible, much of today's city is modern. Visitor attractions include:
Palazzo Comunale, from the 17th century.
Rocca Roveresca – castle of Gothic origins,  restored by Baccio Pontelli in 1492. It has a square plan with four large round tower.
The Cathedral, erected after 1787.
It contains a museum of the mezzadria agrarian life typical of the area, with farm tools, dresses, photos, etc. It once housed the painting of Madonna di Senigallia by Piero della Francesca. 
Chiesa della Croce.
Rotonda a mare, an art nouveau pier.

Twin towns - sister cities
Senigallia is twinned with:
 Chester, United Kingdom
 Lörrach, Germany
 Sens, France

See also
Roman Catholic Diocese of Senigallia
U.S. Vigor Senigallia
Summer Jamboree
Senigallia Public Library

References

Sources

External links

Official website v
Senigallia In a Nutshell: An Illustrated Guidebook to Senigallia
"Sinigaglia" — article on the Catholic diocese, from the New Advent Catholic Encyclopædia

 
Cities and towns in the Marche
Coastal towns in the Marche
Castles in Italy
Duchy of the Pentapolis
Pope Pius IX
Papal States